Artists Repertory Theatre  (Artists Rep) is a professional non-profit theatre located in Portland, Oregon, United States. The longest-running professional theatre company in Portland, since 1982 the company has focused on presenting the works of contemporary playwrights, including world premieres.

In addition to producing six to eight productions in Portland annually, the company runs special programming and collaborations. They tour productions nationally with the support and collaboration of partnering theatre companies and the National Endowment for the Arts. Operating on a repertory or stock company model, their artistic agenda includes the ArtsHub campus collective and Table|Room|Stage initiative for new work.

History

1982–1990

Rebecca Adams (as producing director), Peter Waldron (as designer), Joe Cronin, Amy Fowkes, David Gomes and Vana O'Brien formed Artists Repertory Theatre in 1982; their goal was to present contemporary playwrights' work in an intimate space. Through the early years of the theatre, they used the local YWCA's 110–seat Wilson Center for the Performing Arts as their performance area. In 1988, Artists Rep appointed Allen Nause to the position of artistic director; he would go on to hold the position for over 20 years.

1990–1999
Artists Rep creates an improvisation and role-playing program to teach life-skills named ART Reach (later renamed Actors to Go) in 1990. In 1991, Artists Rep began a development program, focused on creating new plays; and in its first year Artists Rep earned an Oregon Book Nomination for their world premiere production of Nancy Klementowski's After the Light Goes.

In 1995 they began a campaign to raise money for a new facility. After 2 years, Artists Rep was able to raise $1.2 million; with this money they moved into the Alder St. space, which included a 172–seat black box theater, administrative offices, a green room and dressing rooms, set–building shop, wardrobe room and rehearsal hall. In 1997, they were able to expand their presence in the world with an Artists Rep production at an international human rights play festival held on a tour of Pakistan.

2000–2009
To begin the new millennia, in 2000 Artists Rep chose to participate in the first-ever-reciprocal artistic collaboration between the United States and Vietnam, the Vietnam America Theatre Exchange. To accommodate demand, Artists Rep started a second Ssage season in 2002; these productions would take place at an off-site location as the Alder St. space was too small. In 2004 they were one of only six companies nationally to be selected to the largest-ever tour of Shakespeare in U.S. history. This would be a continuation of their previous US/Vietnam collaboration, but extended to a tour of the seven Western states through the National Endowment for the Arts'"Shakespeare in American Communities" initiative.

Later that year, Artists Rep began the expansion of their theatre space with the purchase of a 29,000 sq.ft. area of an entire city block for $4.8 million. The next year, 2005, Artists Rep opened an on-site location, the Morrison Stage, for their second stage productions; it would feature a more intimate setting with 164 seats. In 2008, Michael Mendelson, Vana O'Brien, Amaya Villazan and Todd Van Voris would become Artists Rep's first Resident Acting Company, and they all still remain members to this day. After opening the Morrison Stage in 2005, Artists Rep planned in 2009 to connect the two theatres with the construction of a staircase and the expansion of the Alder St. Stage's lobby.

2010–
Artists Rep kicked off its 2010/11 season with a co-production of Eugene O'Neill's Long Day's Journey Into Night with the Sydney Theatre Company. The cast included Academy Award winning actor William Hurt, Australian star of stage and screen Robyn Nevin, Artists Rep Company Member Todd Van Voris, and Sydney Theatre Company Members Luke Mullins and Emily Russell.

In 2012, Artists Rep celebrated its thirtieth anniversary season. Allen Nause, the theatre's artistic director for twenty-five years announced his retirement, to be succeeded and Dámaso Rodríguez. The following season, Rodríguez expanded Artists Rep's resident artists to include not only actors but also directors, designers, playwrights, and small experimental ensembles. Artists Rep became an arts campus, housing initially eight arts organizations within its red walls, including the August Wilson Red Door Project, Portland Revels, Profile Theatre, Portland Area Theatre Alliance, and the Portland Shakespeare Project. While the Traveling Lantern Theatre Company and Polaris Dance Theatre are no longer members of the ArtsHub, as of 2019, Hand2Mouth Theatre, the LineStorm Playwrights collective, Portland Actors Conservatory, and the Fertile Ground Festival for new work are facilitated by the venue. This ArtsHub initiative won the 2016 Light A Fire Award for inspiring creativity.

Rodríguez has implemented a series of new initiatives to support theatre-makers from varied backgrounds and facilitate new work in addition to the ArtsHub. After the appointment of Luan Schooler as Director of New Play Development and Dramaturgy, the pair initiated Table|Room|Stage (T|R|S) that facilitates new work at a variety of stages–from refining pre-existing work to commissions new work and staging world premiers. A pilot program begun in 2014, notable successes have included Andrea Stolowitz's Oregon Book Award-winning Ithaka, about returning women combat veterans, and E.M. Lewis's Magellanica, a six-hour epic about scientists studying climate change in Antarctica that was recognized with an Edgerton Award from TCG. Also in 2014, in the wake of a $500,000 gift, Rodríguez dramatically increased the resident company to 20 members.

2018 saw a dramatic series of material changes at the theatre. In 2018, the company was hard-pressed to pay-off and IRS lien filed for lapses in its payroll tax filings going back to 2012 (paid off in early December). Property taxes and the expensive mortgage typical of Pacific Northwest urban centers remained the issue, so the company decided to sell half of its 2004 block-fixed, 29,000 square-foot property to an Atlanta-based developer. The buyer, Wood Partners, plans to build twenty-story mixed-use building with 296 housing units, 4,000 square feet of retail, and 206 below-grade parking spaces.

Shortly thereafter, the company received an unrestricted $7 million gift from an anonymous donor. Coming in at twice the theatre's annual operating budget, the gift was the largest donation in the company's history, and one of the largest gifts that has ever made to an arts institution in Oregon to date. While still maintaining the sale of half their headquarter property, Artist Director Rodriguez who was then also the interim Managing Director decided to use the funds to pay off the remaining mortgage and over half a million dollars in overdue bills to vendors, a line of credit and credit card bills. The remaining funds have been set aside in an operating cash reserve, a backfill a fund for specific programs, and $1.6 million for substantial renovations to the remaining portion of the building. The substantial gift was seen by the range of artists and companies who depend on the space as a city-changing act of generosity.

Amidst the changes, ART was also able to hire J.S. (John Stuart) May as the new managing director in the wake of Sarah Horton's departure. By mid-2019, architectural plans were released by May for the new two-theater complex with room for the ArtsHub companies, as well as a $10 million capital campaign. The company's 2019–20 season will be "On Tour", renting spaces across the city with Imago Theatre, Portland Opera, the Tiffany Center, Portland Center Stage, and Portland State University to put up the skeleton six-show season.

Ensemble
ART has operated on a repertory company model since 2008, meaning that they employ a dedicated stable of actors, playwrights, and other theatre-makers throughout a season rather than casting anew for each individual production. The company varies in size over time, sometimes as large as twenty-seven members. The resident artists contribute to programming decisions, education and community engagement, and develop new work for the theatre.

Artistic directors

 Jeanette Harrison, 2022– present 
 Dámaso Rodríguez, 2013–2021
 Allen Nause, 1988–2012

Resident artists
 Linda Alper (actor, playwright), 2011–
 Ayanna Berkshire (actor), 2015–
 Bobby Brewer-Wallin (costume designer), 2016–
 Chris Harder (actor), 2014–
 JoAnn Johnson (actor, director), 2008–
 Kevin Jones (actor, director), 2008–
 Val Landrum (actor), 2002–
 Sarah Lucht (actor), 2013–
 Susannah Mars (actor), 2012–
 Michael Mendelson (actor, director), 2008–
 Amy Newman (actor), 2013–
 Vana O'Brien (actor), 2008–
 Rodolfo Ortega (composer, sound designer), 2014–
 Sharath Patel (sound designer), 2012–
 Gregory Pulver (costume designer), 2011–
 John San Nicolas (actor), 2011–
 Vin Shambry (actor), 2011–
 Andrea Stolowitz (playwright), 2017–
 Todd Van Voris (actor), 2014–
 Amaya Villazan (actor), 2014–
 Joshua J. Weinstein (actor), 2012–
 Megan Wilkerson (scene designer), 2014–
 Carol Ann Wohlmut (stage manager), 2008–

Productions

2022/2023 season 
 The Hombres by Tony Meneses
 the ripple, the wave that carried me home by Christina Anderson a co-production with Portland Center Stage
 American Fast by Kareem Fahmy
 True Story by E.M. Lewis

2021/2022 season 
 The Chinese Lady by Lloyd Suh
 The Great Leap by Lauren Yee a co-production with Portland Center Stage
 The Children by Lucy Kirkwood

2019/2020 season
 1984 adapted by Robert Icke and Duncan Macmillan from the novel by George Orwell
 La Ruta by Isaac Gomez
 The Strange Undoing of Prudencia Hart by David Greig
 School Girls; or, The African Mean Girls Play by Jocelyn Bioh
 Indecent by Paula Vogel
 Looking for Tiger Lily by Anthony Hudson, world premiere

2018/2019 season
 Skeleton Crew by Dominique Morisseau
 Unexploded Ordinances by Split Britches
 Small Mouth Sounds by Bess Wohl
 Everybody by Branden Jacobs-Jenkins
 It's a Wonderful Life: A Live Radio Play by Joe Landry
 Teenage Dick by Mike Lew
 A Doll's House, Part 2 by Lucas Hnath
 Wolf Play by Hansol Jung, world premiere
 The Revolutionists by Lauren Gunderson

2017/2018 season
 An Octoroon by Branden Jacobs-Jenkins
 Caught by Christopher Chen
 The Humans by Stephen Karam
 Magellanica by E.M. Lewis, world premiere
 Between Riverside and Crazy by Stephen Adly Guirgis
 The Thanksgiving Play by Larissa FastHorse
 I and You by Lauren Gunderson

2017/2018 Frontier Series
 They, Themself, and Schmerm by Becca Blackwell
 The Holler Sessions by Frank Boyd
 White Rabbit Red Rabbit by Nassim Soleimanpour

2016/2017 season
 Trevor by Nick Jones
 American Hero by Bess Wohl
 A Civil War Christmas: An American Musical Celebration by Paula Vogel
 Marjorie Prime by Jordan Harrison
 Feathers and Teeth by Charise Castro Smith
 The Talented Ones by Yussef El Guindi
 The Importance of Being Earnest by Oscar Wilde

2016/2017 Frontier Series
 The Future Show by Deborah Pearson
 Winners and Losers by Marcus Youssef and James Long
 Rodney King by Roger Guenveur Smith

2015/2016 season
 The Understudy by Theresa Rebeck
 Cuba Libre by Carlos Lacámara and Jorge Gómez
 Broomstick by John Biguenet
 The Miracle Worker by William Gibson
 Mothers and Sons by Terrence McNally
 We Are Proud to Present by Jackie Sibblies Drury
 Grand Concourse by Heidi Schreck
 The Skin of Our Teeth by Thornton Wilder

2014/2015 season
 Intimate Apparel by Lynn Nottage
 Exiles by Carlos Lacámara
 Blithe Spirit by Noël Coward
 Tribes by Nina Raine
 The Invisible Hand by Ayad Akhtar
 The Price by Arthur Miller
 4000 Miles by Amy Herzog
 The Liar by David Ives, adapted from the comedy by Pierre Corneille

2013/2014 season
 The Big Meal by Dan LeFranc
 Mistakes Were Made by Craig Wright
 Foxfinder by Dawn King
 The Reason for the Season by Matt Pelfrey 
 The Night Before Christmas by Anthony Neilson
 The Monster-Builder by Amy Freed
 The Motherfucker with the Hat by Stephen Adly Guirgis
 The Quality of Life by Jane Anderson
 The Playboy of the Western World by J.M. Synge

2012/2013 season
 And So It Goes... by Aaron Posner
 Seven Guitars by August Wilson
 Sherlock Holmes and Case of the Christmas Carol by John Longenbaugh
 The Lost Boy by Susan Mach
 Red Herring by Michael Hollinger
 The Gin Game by D.L. Coburn
 Ten Chimneys by Jeffrey Hatcher
 Ithaka by  Andrea Stolowitz

2011/2012 season
 God of Carnage by Yasmina Reza
 No Man's Land by Harold Pinter
 Sherlock Holmes and Case of the Christmas Carol by John Longenbaugh
 (I Am Still) The Duchess of Malfi adapted by Joseph Fisher from the play by John Webster
 Circle Mirror Transformation by Annie Baker
 Race by David Mamet
 Standing On Ceremony by Jordan Harrison, Moisés Kaufman, Mo Gaffney, Neil LaBute, Wendy McLeod, José Rivera, Paul Rudnick, and Doug Wright
 Next To Normal by Brian Yorkey and Tom Kitt

2010/2011 season
 Long Day's Journey Into Night by Eugene O'Neill
 Ah, Wilderness! by Eugene O'Neill
 The Hillsboro Story by Susan Banyas
 Mars on Life – LIVE! by Susannah Mars
 Superior Donuts by Tracy Letts
 The Lieutenant of Inishmore by Martin McDonagh
 Jack Goes Boating by Bob Glaudini
 The Cherry Orchard by Anton Chekhov, adapted by Richard Kramer

2009/2010 season
 All My Sons by Arthur Miller
 Becky's New Car by Steven Dietz
 Holidazed by Marc Acito and C.S. Whitcomb
 Design for Living by Noël Coward
 Othello by William Shakespeare
 Gracie and the Atom by McKinley

2008/2009 season
 Blackbird by David Harrower
 Eurydice by Sarah Ruhl
 Speech & Debate by Stephen Karam
 Holidazed by Marc Acito and C.S. Whitcomb
 The Seafarer by Conor McPherson
 String of Pearls by Michele Lowe
 Distracted by Lisa Loomer
 Three Sisters by Anton Chekhov, adapted by Tracy Letts

2007/2008 season
 House and Garden by Alan Ayckbourn
 The Ghosts of Celilo by Marv Ross
 Mars on Life: the Holiday Edition by Susannah Mars and Grant Byington
 The Clean House by Sarah Ruhl
 Rabbit Hole by David Lindsey-Abaire
 A Streetcar Named Desire by Tennessee Williams
 The History Boys by Alan Bennett

2006/2007 season
 Metamorphoses by Mary Zimmerman
 Mr. Marmalade by Noah Haidle
 Inspecting Carol by Daniel Sullivan
 Mars on Life: the Holiday Edition by Susannah Mars and Grant Byington
 Vanya by Anton Chekhov, adapted by Tom Wood
 The Retreat from Moscow by William Nicholson
 They Came from Way Out There by Beecham, Hillgartner and Hume
 Orson's Shadow by Austin Pendleton

2005/2006 season
 Enchanted April adapted by Matthew Barber from the novel by Elizabeth von Arnim
 Bug by Tracy Letts
 Owen Meany's Christmas Pageant adapted by Jane Jones and Myra Platt from the novel by John Irving
 The Seagull by Anton Chekhov, adapted by Joseph Fisher
 Frozen by Bryony Lavery
 Assassins by Stephen Sondheim and John Weidman
 Theater District by Richard Kramer

2004/2005 season
 A Midsummer Night's Dream by William Shakespeare
 The Mercy Seat by Neil LaBute
 Mrs. Bob Cratchit's Wild Christmas Binge by Christopher Durang
 Death of a Salesman by Arthur Miller
 Humble Boy by Charlotte Jones
 Blue/Orange by Joe Penhall
 Take Me Out by Richard Greenberg

2003/2004 season
 Topdog/Underdog by Suzan-Lori Parks
 Nickel and Dimed by Joan Holden
 Appalachian Ebeneezer by Randi Douglas and Cheyney Ryan
 The Goat, or Who is Sylvia? by Edward Albee
 The Drawer Boy by Michael Healy
 Lobby Hero by Kenneth Lonergan
 The New House by Carlo Goldoni, adapted by Joseph Fisher

2002/2003 season
 The Night of the Iguana by Tennessee Williams
 The Shape of Things by Neil LaBute
 Honey in the Horn by Michael Lasswell
 Proof by David Auburn
 Two Sisters and a Piano by Nilo Cruz
 Touch by Toni Press-Coffman
 Copenhagen by Michael Frayn

2001/2002 season
 The Crucible by Arthur Miller
 Crumbs from the Table of Joy by Lynn Nottage
 My Castle's Rockin': The Alberta Hunter Story by Larry Parr
 Art by Yasmina Reza
 Dinner with Friends by Donald Margulies
 Killer Joe by Tracy Letts
 The Laramie Project by Moises Kaufman

2000/2001 season
 The Beauty Queen of Leenane by Martin McDonagh
 Ain't Misbehavin''' by Murray Horwitz and Richard Maltby, Jr.
 Never the Sinner by John Logan
 The Weir by Conor McPherson
 Side Man by Warren Leight

1999/2000 season
 Gross Indecency: The Three Trials of Oscar Wilde by Moises Kaufman
 Present Laughter by Noël Coward
 A Raisin in the Sun by Lorraine Hansberry
 Master Class by Terrence McNally
 Wit by Margaret Edson

1998/1999 season
 How I Learned to Drive by Paula Vogel
 Having Our Say by Emily Mann, adapted from the book by Sarah L. and A. Elizabeth Delany
 Three Days of Rain by Richard Greenberg
 A Question of Mercy by David Rabe
 The Misanthrope by Molière, translated and adapted by Lauren Goldman Marshall

1997/1998 season
 A Delicate Balance by Edward Albee
 Chaps! by Jahnna Beecham and Malcolm Hillgartner
 Sweet Phoebe by Michael Gow
 Indiscretions by Jean Cocteau
 Incorruptible by Michael Hollinger

1996/1997 season
 Travels with my Aunt adapted by Giles Havergal from the novel by Graham Greene 
 Quilters by Molly Newman and Barbara Damashek
 The Sea by Edward Bond
 Amazing Grace by Michael Cristofer
 Love! Valour! Compassion! by Terrence McNally

1995/1996 season
 Abundance by Beth Henley
 Fortinbras by Lee Blessing
 Picasso in the Back Seat by D. Roberts
 Beast on the Moon by Richard Kalinoski
 Buried Child by Sam Shepard
 The Normal Heart by Larry Kramer
 The Destiny of Me by Larry Kramer

1994/1995 season
 A Thousand Clowns by Herb Gardner
 Joined at the Head by Catherine Butterfield
 Park Your Car in Harvard Yard by Israel Horowitz
 Keely and Du by Jane Martin
 A Perfect Ganesh by Terrence McNally

1993/1994 season
 The Marriage of Bette and Boo by Christopher Durang
 The Tooth of Crime by Sam Shepard
 Marvin's Room by Scott McPherson
 Breaking the Code by Hugh Whitemore
 Birdsend by Keith Huff
 A Pirate's Lullaby by Jessica Litwak

1992/1993 season
 The Diary of Anne Frank by Frances Goodrich and Albert Hackett
 Escape from Happiness by George F. Walker
 A Texas Romance by Ellsworth Schave
 Ballerina by Arne Skouen
 A Taste of Honey by Shelagh Delaney
 The Artificial Jungle by John Ludlam

1991/1992 season
 The Swan by Elizabeth Egloff
 Love Letters by A.R. Gurney
 Three Ways Home by Casey Kurtti
 The Gift of the Magi adapted by Peter Ekstrom
 Sharon and Billy by Alan Bowne
 Autumn Elegy by Charlene Redick
 Gossip by George F. Walker
 An Evening with Scott Parker by Scott Parker

1990/1991 season
 Italian American Reconciliation by John Patrick Shanley
 Orphans by Lyle Kessler
 Eleemosynary by Lee Blessing
 The Subject was Roses by Frank D. Gilroy
 After the Light Goes by Nancy Klementowski
 Same Boat, Brother by Earl Robinson
 The Tony del Mar Show by Jon Newton
 Lurain Penny's Christmas Story by Leigh Clark
 Lurain penny: Hung Over by Leigh Clark

1989/1990 season
 The Voice of the Prairie by John Olive
 Visions by Dorothy Velasco
 Holiday Voices devised by the ART company
 Frankie and Johnny in the Clair de Lune by Terrence McNally
 Six Women with Brain Death by Cheryl Benge, Christy Brandt, Rosanna E. Coppedge, Valerie Fagan, Ross Fresse, Mark Houston, Sandee Johnson, and Peggy Pharr Wilson
 Long Day's Journey into Night by Eugene O'Neill
 Lloyd's Prayer by Kevin Kling
 Two-Two, Four-Four by Gary Philpott
 Smart Aleck by unknown

1988/1989 season
 Pump Boys and Dinettes by John Foley, Mark Hardwick, Debra Monk, Cass Morgan, John Schimmel, and Jim Wann
 Winnie the Pooh by A.A. Milne
 Dear Liar by Jerome Kilty
 Red Noses by Peter Barnes
 Independence by Lee Blessing
 We Won't Pay! We Won't Pay! by Dario Fo
 The Fox by Allan Miller

1987/1988 season
 In The Sweet Bye and Bye by Donald Driver
 The Four Mickies by Ted Savinar
 The Majestic Kid by Mark Medoff
 The Country Girl by Clifford Odets
 The H2iner by unknown
 Daughters of Eden by Jan Baross
 Danny and the Deep Blue Sea by John Patrick Shanley
 On the Edge by unknown
 Jesse and the Bandit Queen by David Freeman
 The Diviners by Jim Leonard Jr.

1986/1987 season
 Strange Snow by Steve Metcalfe
 Terra Nova by Ted Tally
 Childe Byron by  Romulus Linney
 Passion by Peter Nichols
 Nice People Dancing to Good Country Music by Lee Blessing
 Season's Greetings by Alan Ayckbourn
 The Miss Firecracker Contest by Beth Henley
 Graceland by unknown 
 Sea Marks by Gardner McKay

1985/1986 season
 Quilters by Molly Newman and Barbara Damashek
 The Nutcracker adapted by unknown 
 Baby with the Bathwater by Christopher Durang
 Serenading Louie by Lanford Wilson
 Ofoti by Jack Wheatcroft

1984/1985 season
 Plenty by David Hare 
 The Haunting of Hill House adapted by F. Andrew Leslie from the book by Shirley Jackson
 Season's Greetings by Alan Ayckbourn
 Toys in the Attic by Lillian Hellman
 The Tempest by William Shakespeare
 Top Girls by Caryl Churchill
 Educating Rita by Willy Russell
 Private Wars by unknown
 The Madness of Lady Bright by Lanford Wilson

1983/1984 season
 The Dresser by Ronald Harwood
 Jack and the Beanstalk adapted by unknown 
 Angels Fall by Lanford Wilson
 Lysistrata by Aristophanes
 A Lesson from Aloes by Athol Fugard
 To Grandmother's House We Go by Joanna McClelland Glass
 The Ice Wolf by unknown
 My Room by unknown

1982/1983 season
 Loose Ends by Michael Weller
 Butley by Simon Gray
 The Mound Builders by Lanford Wilson
 Aladdin by unknown
 Angel Street by Patrick Hamilton
 Sister Mary Ignatius Explains It All For You by Christopher Durang
 The Actor's Nightmare'' by Christopher Durang

References

External links

 Official website
 List of complete production history

1982 establishments in Oregon
Organizations based in Portland, Oregon
Performing groups established in 1982
Regional theatre in the United States
Theatre companies in Oregon
Theatres in Portland, Oregon
Culture of Portland, Oregon
Oregon culture